Eranina argentina is a species of beetle in the family Cerambycidae. It was described by Bruch in 1911. It is known from Argentina and Paraguay.

References

Eranina
Beetles described in 1911